The 2009–10 Maltese Second Division started in September 2009 and will end in May 2010. Rabat Ajax and Senglea Athletic were relegated from the 2008–09 Maltese First Division. Gzira United, Gharghur and Zurrieq were promoted from the 2008–09 Maltese Third Division. The Maltese Second Division 2009–10 was won by Lija Athletic. The runners-up were St. Andrews. Gharghur and Gozo FC were relegated. Santa Venra Lightning were also relegated after losing in the relegation playoffs.

Participating teams
 Birzebbuga St.Peters
 Gharghur
 Gozo FC
 Gzira United
 Lija Athletic
 Mellieha
 Rabat Ajax
 Senglea Athletic
 St.Andrews
 Santa Venera Lightning
 Zebbug Rangers
 Zurrieq

Changes from previous season
 Balzan Youths and Melita were promoted to 2009–10 Maltese First Division. They were replaced with Rabat Ajax and Senglea Athletic, both relegated from 2008–09 Maltese First Division
 Naxxar Lions, Mgarr United and Marsa were relegated to 2009–10 Maltese Third Division. They were replaced with Gzira United, Gharghur and Zurrieq, all promoted from the 2008–09 Maltese Third Division.

Final league table

Results

Maltese Second Division seasons
Malta
3